A deal, or deals may refer to:

Places

United States
 Deal, New Jersey, a borough
 Deal, Pennsylvania, an unincorporated community
 Deal Lake, New Jersey

Elsewhere
 Deal Island (Tasmania), Australia
 Deal, Kent, a town in England
 Deal, a village in Câlnic Commune, Alba County, Romania

Arts and entertainment
 Deal, the distribution of cards in a card game to the players

Film and television
 Deal (1978 film), a documentary about the TV show Let's Make a Deal distributed by SFM Entertainment
 Deal (2008 film), about poker
 Deal (Greek game show)

Music
 "Deal" (Tom T. Hall song), by Tom T. Hall
 "Deal", a song from Jerry Garcia's 1972 album  Garcia
 "Deal", a song by Man Overboard from Heavy Love
 DEAL$, a band fronted by Angela Seo

Brands and enterprises
 Deal (automobile), built in Jonesville, Michigan, US, from 1905 to 1911
 Deals, a defunct American dollar store chain

Science and technology
 Deal (unit), a unit of volume used to measure wood
 DEAL (Data Encryption Algorithm with Larger blocks), in cryptography 
 deal.II, an open source library to solve partial differential equations

Other uses
 Battle of Deal, fought in the English town of Deal in 1495
 Royal Marine Depot, Deal, Kent, England
 Deal (surname)
 Deal, a type of cheap wood, usually from fir (red deal) or pine trees

See also
 The Deal (disambiguation)
 Deel (disambiguation)
 Dele (disambiguation)
 Bargain (disambiguation)